Wasp was launched at Hull in 1809. She traded as a West Indiaman and in 1812 she was lengthened, which increased her burthen to 319 tons. This does not appear in the issues of Lloyd's Register that are the basis for the table below, but does appear in a different volume of a Register of Shipping. After the commencement of the War of 1812 she sailed under a letter of marque that too recorded her burthen as 319 tons.

Letter of marque: Edward Archer
Letter of marque: John Crabtree

Wasp and Crabtree arrived at St Thomas on 10 January 1814. Crabtree reported that the day before he had encountered an American privateer west of Saba but that it had sailed away when he gave chase, fearing that Wasp was a warship. On 11 January, the British merchantman Hibernia, of 22 men and six guns, Lennon, master, too encountered the privateer. After an intense 9-hour single-ship action that left one man killed on Hibernia, and 11 wounded, Hibernia succeeded in driving Comet off. Comet had three men killed and eight men wounded.

On 12 October 1817 Wasp, John Ware, master, and Thomas Staniforth and Thomas Blunt, owners, received a license at Gibraltar from the British East India Company. The license authorized Wasp to trade with India. Then on 29 December 1818 they received a license again, but this time at Malta. Each license only cost £5. Wasp left Calcutta on 5 April 1818, bound for Gibraltar and Malta.

In 1820 Wasp changed owners and thereafter made one voyage as a whaler. The outcome and duration are currently obscure. Wasp is no longer listed after 1827.

The data in the table below are from Lloyd's Register. The information is only as accurate as owners bothered to keep it updated.

Citations

1809 ships
Whaling ships
Age of Sail merchant ships
Merchant ships of the United Kingdom